Alfredo Pereira (born 23 May 1992) is a Portuguese male acrobatic gymnast. With partner Mariana Gradim Alves Amorim, Pereira competed in the 2014 Acrobatic Gymnastics World Championships.

References

1992 births
Living people
Portuguese acrobatic gymnasts
Male acrobatic gymnasts
Place of birth missing (living people)